Cicely Louise Tyson (December 19, 1924January 28, 2021) was an American actress. In a career which spanned more than seven decades in film, television and theatre, she became known for her portrayal of strong African-American women. Tyson received various awards including three Emmy Awards, a Screen Actors Guild Award, a Tony Award, an Honorary Academy Award, and a Peabody Award.

Having appeared in minor film and television roles early in her career, Tyson garnered widespread attention and critical acclaim for her performance as Rebecca Morgan in Sounder (1972); she was nominated for both the Academy Award for Best Actress and Golden Globe Award for Best Actress in a Motion Picture – Drama for her work in the film. Tyson's portrayal of the title role in the 1974 television film The Autobiography of Miss Jane Pittman, based on the 1971 novel of the same name by Ernest J. Gaines, won her further praise; among other accolades, the role won her two Emmy Awards and a nomination for a BAFTA Award for Best Actress in a Leading Role. She received another Emmy Award nomination for her role as Binta in the acclaimed series Roots (1977).

Tyson continued to act on film and television in the 21st century in projects such as Fried Green Tomatoes (1991), A Lesson Before Dying (1999), Because of Winn-Dixie, Diary of a Mad Black Woman (both 2005), The Help (2011), The Trip to Bountiful (2014) and Last Flag Flying (2017). She also played the recurring role of Ophelia Harkness in the ABC legal drama TV series How to Get Away With Murder since the show's inception in 2014, for which she was nominated for the Primetime Emmy Award for Outstanding Guest Actress in a Drama Series five times.

In addition to her screen career, Tyson appeared in various theater productions. She received a Vernon Rice Award in 1962 for her Off-Broadway performance in Moon on a Rainbow Shawl. Tyson also starred as Carrie Watts in the Broadway play The Trip to Bountiful, winning the Tony Award, the Outer Critics Award, and the Drama Desk Award for Best Actress in a Play in 2013. She returned to Broadway in the 2016 revival of The Gin Game starring opposite James Earl Jones. Tyson was named a Kennedy Center honoree in 2015. In November 2016, Tyson received the Presidential Medal of Freedom, which is the highest civilian honor in the United States. In 2020, she was inducted into the Television Hall of Fame.

Early life
Tyson was born in the Bronx, New York City, but soon relocated with her family to East Harlem. She was one of three children born to Fredericka (Huggins) Tyson, a domestic worker, and William Augustine Tyson, who worked as a carpenter and painter. Her parents were immigrants from Nevis in the West Indies. Her father arrived in New York City at age 21 and was processed at Ellis Island on August 4, 1919.

Tyson grew up in a religious atmosphere. She sang in the choir and attended prayer meetings at an Episcopal church in East Harlem. Tyson's mother was opposed to her becoming an actress and would not speak to her for a time. She changed her mind when she saw Cicely appear on stage.

In 1963, while a student at New York's New School For Social Research, Tyson appeared on the network television game show To Tell The Truth as an "imposter" for Australian singer Shirley Abicair, receiving two of the four possible votes.

Career

Early work

Tyson was discovered by a photographer for Ebony magazine and became a successful fashion model. Her first acting role was a bit part in the 1956 film Carib Gold and she first appeared onstage in Vinnette Carroll's production of Dark of the Moon at the Harlem YMCA in 1958. Tyson had small roles in the 1959 films Odds Against Tomorrow and The Last Angry Man, as well as the 1960 comedy, Who Was That Lady? 1n 1961, she made her television debut in the NBC series Frontiers of Faith.

In the early 1960s, Tyson appeared in the original cast of French playwright Jean Genet's The Blacks. She played the role of Stephanie Virtue Secret-Rose Diop; other notable cast members included Maya Angelou, James Earl Jones, Godfrey Cambridge, Louis Gossett Jr., and Charles Gordone. The show was the longest running off-Broadway non-musical of the decade, running for 1,408 performances. She won the 1961-1962 Vernon Rice Award (later known as the Drama Desk Award) for her performance in another off-Broadway production, Moon on a Rainbow Shawl.

Tyson, who once worked for a social services agency, was spotted by producer David Susskind in The Blacks and in Tiger, Tiger, Burning Bright, and was cast for a role in the CBS TV series East Side/West Side (1963–1964), playing the secretary of a social worker played by George C. Scott. She was at the time the only African-American regular member of a TV cast, The show was noted for its treatment of social issues, and one of its episodes, on an African-American couple in Harlem (played by James Earl Jones and Diana Sands), was blacked out in Atlanta and Shreveport, Louisiana.

In the mid-1960s she had a recurring role in the soap opera The Guiding Light. She appeared with Sammy Davis Jr. in the film A Man Called Adam (1966) and had a small role in the film version of The Comedians (1967) based on the Graham Greene novel. In 1968 Tyson had a featured role in The Heart Is a Lonely Hunter.

Stardom
In 1972, Tyson played the role of Rebecca Morgan in the film Sounder. She was nominated for both the Academy Award and Golden Globe Award for Best Actress for her work in Sounder, and also won the NSFC Best Actress and NBR Best Actress Awards.

In 1974, Tyson played the title role in the television film The Autobiography of Miss Jane Pittman. Tyson's portrayal of a centenarian black woman's life from slavery until her death before the Civil rights movement won her a Primetime Emmy Award for Outstanding Lead Actress – Miniseries or a Movie and an Emmy Award for Actress of the Year – Special. Tyson was also nominated for a BAFTA Award for Best Actress in a Leading Role for her work in this television film.

Tyson's television roles included: Binta in the 1977 miniseries Roots, for which she was nominated for a Primetime Emmy Award for Outstanding Supporting Actress – Miniseries or a Movie; Coretta Scott King in the 1978 miniseries King, for which she was nominated for a Primetime Emmy Award for Outstanding Lead Actress – Miniseries or a Movie; Marva Collins in the 1981 television film The Marva Collins Story, for which she received an NAACP Image Award for Outstanding Actress in a Television Movie, Mini-Series or Dramatic Special and was nominated for a Primetime Emmy Award for Outstanding Lead Actress – Miniseries or a Movie; and Muriel in the 1986 television film Samaritan: The Mitch Snyder Story, for which she received an NAACP Image Award for Outstanding Actress in a Television Movie, Mini-Series or Dramatic Special.

Later career
In 1989, Tyson appeared in the television miniseries The Women of Brewster Place. In 1991, Tyson appeared in Fried Green Tomatoes as Sipsey. In the 1994–95 television series Sweet Justice, Tyson portrayed a civil rights activist and attorney named Carrie Grace Battle, a character she modeled after Washington, D.C. civil rights and criminal defense lawyer Dovey Johnson Roundtree. Her other notable film roles include the dramas Hoodlum (1997) and Diary of a Mad Black Woman (2005), and the television films Oldest Living Confederate Widow Tells All (1994) (for which she received her third Emmy Award) and A Lesson Before Dying (1999). In 2005, Tyson co-starred in Because of Winn-Dixie.

In 2010, Tyson appeared in Why Did I Get Married Too? and narrated the Paul Robeson Award-winning documentary Up from the Bottoms: The Search for the American Dream. In 2011, Tyson appeared in her first music video in Willow Smith's 21st Century Girl. That same year, she played Constantine Jefferson, a maid in Jackson, Mississippi, in the critically acclaimed period drama The Help. Set in the backdrop of the Civil Rights Movement, the film won the Broadcast Film Critics Association Award for Best Acting Ensemble and the Screen Actors Guild Award for Outstanding Performance by a Cast in a Motion Picture.

At the 67th Tony Awards, on June 9, 2013, Tyson won the Tony Award for Best Actress in a Play for her performance as Miss Carrie Watts in The Trip to Bountiful. Upon winning, the 88-year-old actress became the oldest recipient of the Best Actress Tony Award. She also won the Drama Desk Award for Outstanding Actress in a Play and the Outer Critics Circle Award for Outstanding Actress in a Play for the role.

In 2013, Tyson played a supporting role in the horror film The Haunting in Connecticut 2: Ghosts of Georgia. Beginning in 2014, Tyson guest-starred on How to Get Away with Murder as Ophelia Harkness, the mother of main character Annalise Keating (Viola Davis); for this role, she was nominated for a Primetime Emmy Award for Outstanding Guest Actress in a Drama Series in 2015, 2017, 2018, 2019, and 2020.

In 2020, she starred in the popular movie A Fall From Grace which was featured on Netflix.

Personal life

At the age of 18, Tyson married Kenneth Franklin on December 27, 1942. They had a daughter two months later, in February 1943. According to her divorce decree, her husband abandoned her after less than eighteen months of marriage. The marriage was formally dissolved in 1956.

Tyson began dating jazz trumpeter Miles Davis in the 1960s when he was in the process of divorcing dancer Frances Davis. Davis used a photo of Tyson for his 1967 album, Sorcerer. Davis told the press in 1967 that he intended to marry Tyson in March 1968 after his divorce was finalized, but instead he married singer Betty Davis that September.

Tyson and Davis rekindled their relationship in 1978. They were married on November 26, 1981, in a ceremony conducted by Atlanta mayor Andrew Young at the home of actor Bill Cosby. Their marriage was tumultuous due to Davis' volatile temper and infidelity. Davis credited Tyson with saving his life and helping him overcome his cocaine addiction. They resided in Malibu, California, and New York City, until she filed for divorce in 1988. Their divorce was finalized in 1989, two years before Davis died in 1991.

Tyson was godmother to the singer Lenny Kravitz, having been friends with his mother, actress Roxie Roker, as well as to Denzel Washington's daughter Katia and Tyler Perry's son Aman.

Tyson was an honorary member of Delta Sigma Theta sorority. She was a member of the Abyssinian Baptist Church of New York. She was a vegetarian. She was also a first-cousin of Louis Farrakhan, a longtime leader of the Nation of Islam.

Tyson's memoir, Just as I Am, was published on January 26, 2021, and she promoted the book during the last weeks of her life. When she was asked how she wanted to be remembered in an interview with Gayle King, Tyson said, "I've done my best. That's all."

Death
Tyson died on January 28, 2021, at the age of 96. Her funeral was held February 16 at the Abyssinian Baptist Church in Harlem, and was attended by Tyler Perry, her godson Lenny Kravitz, and Bill and Hillary Clinton.

Tyson was interred in Woodlawn Cemetery (Bronx, New York) with former husband Miles Davis.

Filmography

Selected credits:

The Heart Is a Lonely Hunter (1968)
Sounder (1972)
The Autobiography of Miss Jane Pittman (1974)
Roots (1977)
A Woman Called Moses (1978)
Fried Green Tomatoes (1991)
A Lesson Before Dying (1999)
Because of Winn-Dixie (2005) 
Diary of a Mad Black Woman (2005)
The Help (2011)
The Trip to Bountiful (2014)
How to Get Away with Murder (2015-2020)
House of Cards (2016)
Last Flag Flying (2017)
A Fall From Grace (2020)

Awards and honours

Cicely Tyson is the recipient of numerous accolades, including an Academy Honorary Award, three Emmy Awards, and a Tony Award. Tyson has won three Primetime Emmy Awards for her work in television winning for, The Autobiography of Miss Jane Pittman (1974), and Oldest Living Confederate Widow Tells All (1994). She won the Tony Award for Best Actress in a Play her performance in The Trip to Bountiful in 2014. Tyson won her Honorary Academy Award in 2018 with the inscription reading, ""Whose unforgettable performances and personal integrity have inspired generations of filmmakers, actors and audiences."

Tyson has also received various honours for her lifetime achievement as a groundbreaking artist. In 2015, she received a Kennedy Center Honor. In 2016 she was bestowed the Presidential Medal of Freedom from President Barack Obama. In 2020, she received a Career Achievement Peabody Award. That same year she was inducted into the Television Hall of Fame.

In 1977, Tyson was inducted into the Black Filmmakers Hall of Fame. In 1980, she received the Golden Plate Award of the American Academy of Achievement. In 1982, Tyson was awarded the Women in Film Crystal Award. The award is given to outstanding women who, through their endurance and the excellence of their work, have helped to expand the role of women within the entertainment industry. In 1988, Tyson received a Candace Award for Distinguished Service from the National Coalition of 100 Black Women. In 1997, she received a star on the Hollywood Walk of Fame.

In 2005, Tyson was honored at Oprah Winfrey's Legends Ball. She was also honored by the Congress of Racial Equality, the National Association for the Advancement of Colored People, and the National Council of Negro Women. Tyson was awarded the NAACP's 2010 Spingarn Medal for her contribution to the entertainment industry, her modeling career, and her support of civil rights. Tyson was a recipient of the Kennedy Center Honors in 2015. She was awarded the United States' highest civilian honor, the Presidential Medal of Freedom, by President Barack Obama in November 2016. In September 2018, the Academy of Motion Picture Arts and Sciences announced that Tyson would receive an Academy Honorary Award. On November 18, 2018, Tyson became the first African-American woman to receive an honorary Oscar. In 2018, Tyson was inducted into the American Theater Hall of Fame. One of 12 soundstages was named after Tyson in her honor at Tyler Perry Studios. She was chosen to be inducted into the Television Academy's Hall of Fame in 2020.  In 2022, she was posthumously inducted into the Black Music & Entertainment Walk of Fame in 2022.

Tyson received honorary degrees from Clark Atlanta University, Columbia University; Howard University; and Morehouse College, an all-male historically black college. The Cicely Tyson School of Performing and Fine Arts, a magnet school in East Orange, New Jersey, was named after her in 2009.

Notes

References

External links

 
Interview titled Ms. Cicely Tyson's Fact-Finding Tour of Central Africa, 1985-11-05, In Black America, KUT Radio, American Archive of Public Broadcasting (WGBH and the Library of Congress)
Cicely Tyson at Find a Grave

1924 births
2021 deaths
Age controversies
20th-century American actresses
21st-century African-American people
21st-century African-American women
21st-century American actresses
Academy Honorary Award recipients
Actresses from New York City
African-American actresses
African-American memoirists
African-American women singers
American film actresses
American memoirists
American musical theatre actresses
American people of Saint Kitts and Nevis descent
American stage actresses
American television actresses
American women memoirists
Burials at Woodlawn Cemetery (Bronx, New York)
Delta Sigma Theta members
Jazz musicians from New York (state)
Kennedy Center honorees
Miles Davis
Outstanding Performance by a Cast in a Motion Picture Screen Actors Guild Award winners
Outstanding Performance by a Lead Actress in a Miniseries or Movie Primetime Emmy Award winners
Outstanding Performance by a Supporting Actress in a Miniseries or Movie Primetime Emmy Award winners
People from Harlem
Presidential Medal of Freedom recipients
Spingarn Medal winners
Tony Award winners